Artle Lee Pollard, Jr. (May 5, 1927 – May 12, 1973), was an American racecar driver.

Born in Dragon, Utah, and raised in the Portland, Oregon area,  Pollard drove in the USAC Championship Car series, racing in the 1965–1973 seasons, with 84 career starts, including the 1967–1971 Indianapolis 500 races.  He finished in the top ten 30 times, with two victories, both in 1969, at Milwaukee and Dover.

Pollard died in Indianapolis, Indiana, as a result of injuries sustained in a crash during practice on the first day of time trials for the 1973 Indianapolis 500. The car slammed into the outside wall coming out of turn one, burst into flames, and spun as it headed to the grass on the inside of the short chute. The chassis dug into the grass and flipped upside-down, slid a short distance and then flipped back over as it reached the pavement again in turn two, finally coming to a stop in the middle of the track. The car was demolished.

The impact tore off two wheels immediately, and the wings were also torn off during the slide. Pollard's lap prior to the crash was timed at a speed above . He was found unconscious, and was rushed to Methodist Hospital in the new Cardiac ambulance. Pollard never regained consciousness, and his injuries were reported to include pulmonary damage due to flame inhalation, third degree burns on both hands, face and neck, a fractured right arm, a fractured leg, and a severe spinal cord injury. He was pronounced dead approximately one hour and three minutes after the accident. Pollard had turned 46 one week before he died.

Pollard, away from racing, worked as a car dealer and mechanic and worked with mental health charities. Pollard also served in the United States Navy for a time.

Racing family
Art Pollard's cousin Brad Pollard and Art Pollard's son Mike Pollard both competed in various types of racing.

Complete USAC Championship Car results

Indianapolis 500 results

References

External links

 https://web.archive.org/web/20071205052904/http://artpollard.tripod.com/1972-73.html
 https://web.archive.org/web/20110810203442/http://www.judydippel.com/cmsj/ (Pollard's daughter)
https://artpollardracedriver.info/art-pollard-by-years/art-pollard-racing-in-1973-the-tragedy-and-reactions/
 https://oilpressure.com/2012/02/27/art-pollard-somehow-always-overshadowed/
 https://www.historicracing.com/driverDetail.cfm?driverID=5062
 http://www.mailtribune.com/article/20160430/SPORTS/160439978

1927 births
1973 deaths
Indianapolis 500 drivers
People from Uintah County, Utah
Racing drivers from Utah
Racing drivers who died while racing
Sports deaths in Indiana
Filmed deaths in motorsport
USAC Silver Crown Series drivers